The geographical extreme points of Croatia are

 Northernmost point:
 Sveti Martin na Muri (administratively in the Međimurje County) - 
 Southernmost point:
 Islet Galijula in Palagruža archipelago of the Adriatic Sea (administratively belongs to the city of Komiža on the Isle of Vis, Split-Dalmatia County) - 
 On the mainland: Vitaljina, Cape Oštra on the Prevlaka peninsula (administratively in the municipality of Cavtat, Dubrovnik-Neretva County) - 
 Easternmost point:
 Ilok (administratively part of the Vukovar-Syrmia County) - 
 Westernmost point:
 Bašanija, Cape Lako (administratively part of the city of Umag, Istria County) -

Altitude
 Highest point : Dinara, 
 Lowest point : Adriatic Sea, 0 m

References

Sources

Geography of Croatia
Croatia
Extreme